Juha Tuomi (born 7 November 1989) is a Finnish football player currently playing for FC Lahti.

References
Guardian Football
veikkausliiga.com Profile

1989 births
Living people
Finnish footballers
FC Lahti players
Veikkausliiga players
Association football goalkeepers